Hypotacha soudanensis is a species of moth in the family Erebidae. It is found in Mali and Yemen.

References

Moths described in 2005
Hypotacha
Moths of Africa
Moths of Asia